The Sun Belt is a region of the United States generally considered stretching across the Southeast and Southwest. Another rough definition of the region is the area south of the 36th parallel. Several climates can be found in the region — desert/semi-desert (Eastern California, Nevada, Arizona, New Mexico, Utah, and West Texas), Mediterranean (California), humid subtropical (Alabama, Mississippi, Louisiana, Florida, Georgia, South Carolina, North Carolina, and Texas) and tropical (South Florida).

The Sun Belt has seen substantial population growth since post-World War II from an influx of people seeking a warm and sunny climate, a surge in retiring baby boomers, and growing economic opportunities. The advent of air conditioning created more comfortable summer conditions and allowed more manufacturing and industry to locate in the Sun Belt. Since much of the construction in the Sun Belt is new or recent, housing styles and design are often modern and open. Recreational opportunities in the Sun Belt are often not tied strictly to one season, and many tourist and resort cities, such as Fort Lauderdale, Gulf Shores, Houston, Las Vegas, Los Angeles, Miami, Myrtle Beach, New Orleans, Orlando, Palm Springs, Phoenix, Tucson, San Antonio, San Diego, and Tampa support a tourist industry all year.

Migration

The traditional explanations for the growth are increasing productivity in the South and West and increasing demand for Sunbelt amenities, especially its pleasant weather. Job decline in the Rust Belt is another major reason for migration.

Definition
The Sun Belt comprises the southern tier of the United States, including the states of Alabama, Arizona, Florida, Georgia, Louisiana, Mississippi, New Mexico, South Carolina, Texas, roughly two-thirds of California (up to Greater Sacramento), and the southern parts of North Carolina, Nevada, and Utah. Five of the states—Arizona, California, Florida, Nevada, and Texas—are sometimes collectively called the Sand States because of their abundance of beaches or deserts.  Broader definitions may also include Arkansas, Colorado, Oklahoma, Tennessee and Virginia.

First employed by political analyst Kevin Phillips in his 1969 book The Emerging Republican Majority, the term "Sun Belt" became synonymous with the southern third of the nation in the early 1970s. In this period, economic and political prominence shifted from the Midwest and Northeast to the South and West. Factors such as the warmer climate, the migration of workers from Mexico, and a boom in the agriculture industry allowed the southern third of the United States to grow economically. The climate spurred not only agricultural growth, but also the migration of many retirees to retirement communities in the region, especially in Florida and Arizona.

Industries such as aerospace, defense, and oil boomed in the Sun Belt as companies took advantage of the low involvement of labor unions in the region (due to more recent industrialization, 1930s–1950s) and the proximity of military installations that were major consumers of their products. The oil industry helped propel states such as Texas and Louisiana forward, and tourism grew in Florida, and Southern California. More recently, high tech and new economy industries have been major drivers of growth in California, Florida, Texas, and other parts of the Sun Belt. Texas and California rank among the top five states in the nation with the most Fortune 500 companies.

Projections
In 2005, the U.S. Census Bureau projected that approximately 88% of the nation's population growth between 2000 and 2030 would occur in the Sun Belt. California, Texas, and Florida were each expected to add more than 12 million people during that time, which would make them by far the most populous states in America. Nevada, Arizona, Colorado, Georgia,  Florida, and Texas were expected to be the fastest-growing states.

Events leading up to and including the 2008–2009 recession led some to question whether growth projections for the Sun Belt had been overstated. The economic bubble that led to the recession appeared, to some observers, to have been more acute in the Sun Belt than other parts of the country. Additionally, the traditional lure of cheaper labor markets in the region compared with America's older industrial centers has been eroded by overseas outsourcing trends.

One of the greatest threats facing the belt in the coming decades is water shortages. Communities in California are making plans to build multiple desalination plants to supply fresh water and avert near-term crises. Texas, Georgia, and Florida also face increasingly serious shortages because of their rapidly expanding populations.

Lingering effects from the Great Recession slowed, and in some places even stopped, the migration from the Frost Belt to the Sun Belt, according to data tracking people's movements over the year from July 2012 – 2013. Americans remained cautious about moving to a different state over this period. However, migration to the Sun Belt from the Frost Belt resumed again, according to 2015 Census data estimates, with growing migration to the Sun Belt and out of the Frost Belt.

Politics 
The Sun Belt was a key target region for the Democratic Party in the 2020 United States elections. Democratic presidential candidate Joe Biden narrowly won the states of Arizona and Georgia in the presidential election, and the party gained seats in both states in the Senate elections. In 2022, Senators Mark Kelly of Arizona and Raphael Warnock of Georgia were elected to serve full 6-year terms in the Senate which cemented their hold on the region.

Environment
The environment in the belt is extremely valuable, not only to local and state governments, but to the federal government. Eight of the ten states have extremely high biodiversity (ranging from 3,800 to 6,700 species, not including marine life). The Sun Belt also has the highest number of distinct ecosystems: chaparral, deciduous, desert, grasslands, temperate rainforest, and tropical rainforest.

Some endangered species live within the belt, including:

 American crocodile
 Black-capped vireo
 California condor
 Florida panther
 Mexican Wolf
 West Indian Manatee
 Whooping Crane
 Red-cockaded woodpecker
 Longleaf Pine
 Red Hills salamander
 Fraser Fir
 Giant Sequoia

Major cities

The five largest metropolitan statistical areas are Los Angeles, Dallas, Houston, Miami, and Atlanta. The Los Angeles area is by far the largest, with over 13 million inhabitants . The ten largest metropolitan statistical areas are found in California, Texas, Georgia, North Carolina, Florida, and Arizona. Additionally, the cross-border metropolitan areas of San Diego-Tijuana and El Paso–Juárez lie partially within the Sun Belt. Seven of the ten largest cities in the United States are located in the Sun Belt: Los Angeles (2), Houston (4), Phoenix (6), San Antonio (7), San Diego (8), Dallas (9), and San Jose (10). Los Angeles County has a veteran population of 270 462.

See also
Southernization, refers to the political and cultural effects of the growth of the Sun Belt
Economy of the United States
Corn Belt
Snowbelt
Rust Belt
Sun Belt Conference

References

Further reading
 
 

Regions of the Southern United States
Southwestern United States
Belt
Belt regions of the United States